Michelle Hudson is a former association football player who represented New Zealand at international level.

Hudson made her Football Ferns début in a 6–0 win over New Caledonia on 2 December 1983, and made just one further appearance, in a 3–2 win over Australia on 4 December that same year.

References

Year of birth missing (living people)
Living people
New Zealand women's association footballers
New Zealand women's international footballers
Women's association footballers not categorized by position